Post Office Square  may refer to:

 Post Office Square, Boston, Massachusetts, US
 Post Office Square, Brisbane, Queensland, Australia

See also 
 Postplatz (disambiguation), in German